Ollongren, also Ållongren is a noble family of Finnish origin.
 
The progenitor of the family, Olof, owned an estate of Pepot (Peippola) in Porvoon maalaiskunta. His son Nils Olofsson was a nimismies 1480.

The family was immatriculated into Swedish House of Nobility 1625 under number 115, and it got surname Ållongren i Finland from its coat of arms, displaying two oak tree branches with acorns (modern swedish: ekollon).

The family became extinct in Finland 1806, but continued in Russia. The surname has been made known in Netherlands by astronomer Alexander Ollongren and politician Kajsa Ollongren.

Sources

Falck, Henrik, Ållongren i Finland. Genos 1994:139-140.

External links
Ållongren i Finland nr 115 - Gustaf Elgenstierna, Den introducerade svenska adelns ättartavlor

Families of Finnish ancestry
Finnish noble families
Swedish noble families
Dutch families